Luzhou Laojiao (泸州老窖; Luzhou Old Cellar) is a Chinese liquor distilled from fermented sorghum. It is a baijiu of the "strong aroma" class. It is produced by Luzhou Laojiao Company Limited, which is headquartered in Luzhou, in southern Sichuan, China.

History
The distillery dates back to 1573, in the Ming dynasty, and it is the oldest continuously producing baijiu distillery in the world. It was included in the first "List of National Intangible Cultural Heritage" in 2006. The company produces a baijiu brand named Guojiao 1573 (国窖 1573, 'National Cellar 1573'), in commemoration of its founding year.

Luzhou Laojiao was reportedly the favourite liquor of China's paramount leader, Deng Xiaoping.

The company commenced international operations in 2012, concentrating initially on the Asia-Pacific market but expanding into Africa during 2016–17.

In 2019, Luzhou Laojiao became an associate sponsor of the Australian Open tennis tournament for five years, making it the largest Chinese sponsor in Australian Open history. Court 2 at the tournament's Melbourne Park venue was named the "1573 Arena", after the company's Guojiao 1573 brand, starting from the 2019 Australian Open.

Product characteristics
Luzhou Laojiao is a complex, premium baijiu of the "strong aroma" (nóngxiāng) class. It is a strongly alcoholic (more than 50% alcohol), clear liquid with a sharp aroma of fermented peaches. It is fermented in old cellars (fermentation pits), whose walls are coated with a unique clay composition that gives the spirit its aroma and palate.

Luzhou has a mild climate with extreme temperatures of -1 to +40 °C (30 to 105°F), and annual precipitation of 750 to 1615mm (30 to 65in). This climate is ideal for local soft cereal quality and microbial groups. The Yangtze River water, after treatment by the water plant, is rich in calcium, magnesium and other trace elements. Water quality is weakly acidic, with a suitable hardness.

References

External links
Luzhou Laojiao Company Limited 

Companies listed on the Shenzhen Stock Exchange
Companies based in Sichuan
Chinese brands
Baijiu
Government-owned companies of China
Ming dynasty
Luzhou